Eugene Zwozdesky,  (July 24, 1948 – January 6, 2019) was a Canadian politician in the province of Alberta. He served in the Legislative Assembly of Alberta from 1993 to 2015, and was the Speaker of the Legislative Assembly from 2012 to 2015.

Early life
Zwozdesky was born on July 24, 1948 in Nipawin, Saskatchewan to Ukrainian-Canadian parents Alec and Anna Zwozdesky and came to Alberta at the age of two. He lived in Grand Centre, Hinton and Sangudo before moving to Edmonton, where he lived since 1963. After attending Victoria Composite High School, he obtained bachelor's degrees in arts and education from the University of Alberta. Before becoming involved in politics, Zwozdesky worked as a teacher, administrator, professional musician, and businessman.

Political career
Zwozdesky was first elected in the 1993 Alberta general election as the Alberta Liberal Party's candidate, defeating incumbent Marie Laing of the Alberta New Democratic Party. He was re-elected to the new riding of Edmonton-Mill Creek in the 1997 Alberta general election.

In July 1998, he left the Liberal Party caucus and sat as an Independent member after a dispute over fiscal policy. He joined the governing Progressive Conservatives a month later. In the 2001 Alberta general election, he won by a generous margin over the Liberal challenger Bharat Agnihotri.

Zwozdesky was appointed to the cabinet as Minister of Community Development; after being re-elected in the 2004 Alberta general election, he was appointed Minister of Education.

On December 15, 2006, Zwozdesky was replaced in Premier Ed Stelmach's cabinet by Ron Liepert. He again joined the Alberta Cabinet on June 27, 2007 as Associate Minister for Capital Planning. In 2008, he was the Minister of Aboriginal Relations and Deputy Government House Leader. He was also co-chair of the Advisory Council on Alberta-Ukraine Relations, co-chair of the Cabinet Policy Committee on Public Safety and Services, and a member of the Standing Committee on Privileges and Elections, Standing Orders and Printing.

Zwozdesky has won numerous awards from cultural and arts organizations, as well as the 2005 Alberta Centennial Medal.

Zwozdesky was re-elected in the 2012 provincial election as an incumbent PC candidate. He was defeated in the 2015 Alberta general election by Alberta NDP candidate Denise Woollard.

Personal life and death
Zwozdesky joined the Ukrainian Shumka Dancers in 1963, and danced in the troupe for six years before becoming the musical director, composing and conducting Shumka's music for twenty-five years; he also served in the same role for the Cheremosh Ukrainian Dance Company. He was involved in various other cultural organizations, was the executive director of the Alberta Cultural Heritage Foundation and the Alberta Ukrainian Canadian Centennial Commission, and has served on various voluntary boards. He was married to Christine, with two children.

He died of cancer on January 6, 2019, aged 70.

Electoral record

References

External links

Alberta Legislative Assembly biography Gene Zwozdesky
Edmonton Mill Creek political history, CBC News

1948 births
2019 deaths
Canadian people of Ukrainian descent
Alberta Liberal Party MLAs
Progressive Conservative Association of Alberta MLAs
Canadian male dancers
People from Nipawin, Saskatchewan
Politicians from Edmonton
Members of the Executive Council of Alberta
Speakers of the Legislative Assembly of Alberta
21st-century Canadian politicians
Deaths from cancer in Alberta